The British Military Hospital was a hospital in Hong Kong for the use of the British garrison. It was located at 10–12 Borrett Road from 1907 to 1967. It was built between 1903 and 1906, and officially opened on 1 July 1907.

Often referred to simply as the Bowen Road Hospital, the first generation hospital was a 150-bed hospital constructed of red brick. It consisted of two blocks, each of 3 storeys, configured with wards and a central administrative block. It had commanding views of Victoria Harbour.

During the Japanese occupation, a portion of the hospital was used for the care of prisoners of war. It continued in use until 1967, when it was turned over to the colonial government. The facility was moved to a site in Kowloon.

Bowen Road

Post de-commissioning
Between 1967 and 1972, it became the temporary location for the new Island School, which had obtained a five-year lease from the Government. The east wing is now home to the (Jewish International) Carmel School, and the Canadian International School occupied the west wing of the building from 1994 to 1999, after which it moved to new premises in Aberdeen.

Former hospital buildings on the adjacent site on Borrett Road, vacated in 1969, were used by the Chinese International School during the 1980s. The 10 Borrett Road site became the first home to the West Island School, from 1991 to 1994.

In the 1986 Mid-Levels plan, the site was zoned to become open space. In May 2001, the Town Planning Board re-zoned it to "government, community and institutional use" on the recommendation of the Planning Department and the Antiquities and Monuments Office, allowing the buildings to be preserved. The Main Block and the Annex Block of the Old British Military Hospital are Grade I historic buildings since 2009.

Current occupants of the building include:

 Carmel School
 Chung Ying Theatre Company
 Small World Christian Kindergarten
 Watchdog Early Education Centre

King's Park

In 1967, a new 15-storey British Military Hospital was opened on Wylie Road in the King's Park area, on a site to the east of the Queen Elizabeth Hospital. It replaced the Bowen Road campus. It provided medical treatment for servicemen, their dependants, and returning soldiers from Vietnam. The site was also home to the Officers Mess and Other Ranks Mess, as well as accommodation for servicemen's families in three blocks: Millbank House, Worcester Heights and Canterbury Court.

When the British armed forces suffered a 15% reduction between 1975 and 1978, the Government proposed to use the hospital as an overspill for the Queen Elizabeth Hospital, which was in undercapacity. It would buy bedspace and treatment from the hospital, but the high cost was criticised as unreasonable and lacking in transparency.

Within the Joint Liaison Group, there was a consensus to demolish it. It was officially closed on 30 June 1996 as the British Garrison scaled down from more than 10,000 personnel to about 3,000 due to the approach of 1997.

Post de-commissioning
Between 1996 and 1999, the hospital was turned over to the Philippine Consulate-General as a refuge for dismissed domestic workers, for a token lease of HK$1.

The  site had an estimated market value of HK$5.6 billion in 1995. The site is now a private housing estate, .

References

External links

 BMH Bowen Road Hong Kong

British military hospitals
Defunct hospitals in Hong Kong
Military of Hong Kong under British rule
Hospitals established in 1907
1907 establishments in Hong Kong
Hospitals disestablished in 1996
Island School
1996 disestablishments in Hong Kong